The following is a list of Muslim saints of Algeria. The list includes all Muslim saints with Algerian connections, either because they were of Algerian origin and ethnicity, or because they travelled to Algeria from their own homeland and became noted in their hagiography for their work in Algeria and amongst the Algerian people. A small number may have had no Algerian connection in their lifetime, but have nonetheless become associated with Algeria through the depositing of their relics in Algerian religious houses.

List of saints

A

 Sidi Abd al-Rahman al-Tha'alibi
 Sidi Abd Youssef
 Sidi Abdallah
 Sidi Abdelaziz
 Sidi Abdeldjebar
 Sidi Abdelkader El Hammami
 Sidi Abdelli
 Sidi Abdelmalek
 Sidi Abdelmoumene
 Sidi Abed
 Sidi Abu Madyan
 Sidi Adli
 Sidi Ahmad al-Alawi
 Sidi Ahmad al-Buni
 Sidi Ahmad al-Tijani
 Sidi Ahmed Aqellal
 Sidi Ahmed Bellabès
 Sidi Ahmed ibn Idris
 
 Sidi Ahmed Ouhaddad
 Sidi Ahmed Ouyahia
 Sidi Ahmed Taffer
 Sidi Ahmed Zouaoui
 Sidi Aïch
 Sidi Aïssa
 Sidi Akkacha
 Sidi Ali Benyoub
 Sidi Ali Bounab
 Sidi Ali Boussidi
 Sidi Ali Mellal
 Sidi Ali Moussa
 Sidi Ali Ouyahia
 
 Sidi Amar Ighil El Mal
 Sidi Ameur
 Sidi Amrane
 Sidi Aoun
 Sidi Ayad

B

 Sidi Bahloul
 Sidi Bakhti
 Sidi Bayazid
 Sidi Bel Abbes
 Sidi Belattar
 Sidi Belahcene
 Sidi Belloua
 Sidi Ben Adda
 Sidi Ben Yebka
 Sidi Benaoumer
 Sidi Betqa
 Sidi Bilel
 Sidi Boubekeur
 Sidi Boudjelili
 Sidi Boudrahem
 Sidi Boukebraïene Cherif
 Sidi Bougdour
 Sidi Bouhanifia
 Sidi Boumediene
 Sidi Boumerdassi
 Sidi Boushaki
 Sidi Boussaid
 Sidi Boutouchent
 Sidi Bouzid
 Sidi Brahim El Ghoul

C
 Sidi Chahmi
 Sidi Cheikh
 Sidi Cherif
 Sidi Chouab

D
 Sidi Dahou Zair
 Sidi Damed
 Sidi Daoud
 Sidi Djilali

E

 Sidi El Bachir
 Sidi El Dhehbi
 Sidi El Hasni
 Sidi El Houari
 Sidi El Mowaffaq
 Sidi El Mouhoub
 Sidi Embarek

F
 Sidi Flih
 Sidi Fredj

G

 Sidi Garidi
 Sidi Ghanem
 Sidi Ghiles

H

 Sidi Hachelaf
 Sidi Hadjeres
 Sidi Haydour
 Sidi Hamadouche
 Sidi Hamlaoui
 Sidi Hassaïne
 Sidi Hassan
 Sidi Hellal
 Sidi Hosni

I

J

K
 Sidi Kada
 Sidi Khaled
 Sidi Khelifa
 Sidi Khelil
 Sidi Khettab
 Sidi Khouiled

L

 Lalla Zaynab
 Sidi Ladjel
 Sidi Lahcene
 Sidi Lahlou
 Sidi Lakhdar
 
 Sidi Lantri
 Sidi Lazreg
 Sidi Lebsir
 Sidi Lekhyar

M

 Sidi M'cid
 Sidi M'hamed Benali
 Sidi M'hamed Benaouda
 Sidi M'hamed Bou Qobrine
 Sidi M'hamed Ouali
 Sidi M'hamed Oussaïd
 Sidi M'hand Amokrane
 Sidi M'hand Heddad
 Sidi Makhlouf
 Sidi Mansour
 Sidi Marouf
 Sidi Medjahed
 Sidi Merabet Moussa
 Sidi Merouane
 Sidi Mezghiche
 Sidi Mihoub
 Sidi Mohamed
 Sidi Mohamed al-Khourchoufi
 Sidi Mohamed Chorfi
 Sidi Mohamed Echamekh
 Sidi Mohand Cherif
 Sidi Mohand Oulahdir
 Sidi Moughith
 Sidi Moussa
 Sidi Muhammad ibn Ali al-Sanusi

N

 Sidi Naamane
 Sidi Nadji
 Sidi Naïl

O

 Sidi Okba
 Sidi Omar Ou El Hadj
 Sidi Ouadah
 Sidi Ouali Dada
 Sidi Ouboudaoud
 Sidi Oulhadj Amghar
 Sidi Ouriache

P

Q

R

 Sidi Rabai
 Sidi Rached

S
 Sidi Saad
 Sidi Saada
 Sidi Safi
 Sidi Sahnoun
 Sidi Saïd Amsisen
 Sidi Salem
 Sidi Sanusi
 Sidi Semiane
 Sidi Slimane

T

 Sidi Tahar
 Sidi Thamer
 Sidi Tifour
 Sidi Touati

U
 Sidi Uqba

V

W

X

Y
 Sidi Yacoub
 Sidi Yahia Aydali
 Sidi Yahia Boumerdassi
 Sidi Youb
 Sidi Younès
 Yemma Gouraya

Z

 Sidi Zahar
 Sidi Zarzour
 Lalla Zaynab
 Sidi Ziane

See also
 Algerian Islamic reference
 Islam in Algeria
 Sufism in Algeria
 Zawiyas in Algeria
 List of saints from Africa
 List of Christian saints of Algeria

References

External links
 
 
 
 
 

Algeria
Algeria
Islam in Algeria
Sufism in Algeria
Algerian people
Sufis
African Sufis
Algerian Sufis
Islam in Africa
Sufism in Africa
Algerian Muslims
African Muslims
Arab Muslims
Berber Muslims
Sufi mystics
Sufi religious leaders
Sufi teachers
Sufism
Sufis by nationality
Sunni Sufis
Sufi saints
Algerian Sufi saints
Articles containing video clips
Saints
Saints